Archery has been included in the Summer Youth Olympics since their inauguration. As with archery at the Summer Olympics, only the recurve is competed. Unlike the Summer Olympic competition, a mixed team event is competed, in which competitors are paired across national boundaries to create evenly matched multinational teams, as part of the Youth Olympic Games' spirit of cooperation.

Medalists
Competition format:
 Olympic round (2010–)

Boys' Individual

Girls' Individual

Mixed team

Medal table
As of the 2018 Summer Youth Olympics.

Venues

See also
Archery at the Summer Olympics
List of Olympic medalists in archery
List of Olympic venues in archery

References

 International Olympic Committee results database

External links
IOC Archery
WA homepage

 
Archery
Youth Olympics